Chromatopelma is a monotypic genus of South American tarantulas containing the single species, Chromatopelma cyaneopubescens. Commonly known as greenbottle blue tarantulas due to their metallic blue legs and blue-green carapace, they are very active and fast-growing tarantulas that are particularly attractive to hobbyists. They are native to the Paraguaná Peninsula.

They live in webbed burrows under bushes and tree roots in desert areas of northern Venezuela. The entrance is often extended with webbing, sometimes resembling a funnel shape. These webs may protect the entrance from the harsh desert climate and act as a trap for insects. Their diet can consist of many things. These include crickets, roaches and also worms.

In 2013, Venezuelan scientists announced that Greenbottle blue tarantulas were threatened by overgrazing that is destroying their habitat. Fumigation of cultivated land has also caused the migration of the species towards the Montecano Biological Reserve and the Cerro Santa Ana Natural Monument. In 2015 it was listed as an Endangered species.

Taxonomy
The species was first described by Embrik Strand in 1907 under the name Eurypelma cyaneopubescens, and was moved to the newly created genus Delopelma by Alexander Petrunkevitch in 1939. Delopelma and Eurypelma are now considered to be a synonyms of Aphonopelma and Avicularia, respectively.

In 1997, Gunter Schmidt considered the species sufficiently distinct to warrant the new genus Chromatopelma, a name referring to its striking blue color. He differentiated Chromatopelma from Aphonopelma based on the scopulae of the tarsus on the third leg, bristles that divide the metatarsus from the tarsus on the fourth leg, the very large posterior median eyes, and the single fused spermatheca of females.

See also
 List of Theraphosidae species

References

External links 
 Tarantupedia
 Greenbottle Blue Care Sheet
 Chromatopelma cyaneopubescens care

Invertebrates of Venezuela
Monotypic Mygalomorphae genera
Spiders of South America
Theraphosidae